The doghead or cynocephaly phenomenon is a widespread legend involving creatures with human bodies and the heads of dogs.

Doghead may also refer to:
Doghead (comics), a 1992 comic book by Al Columbia
Doghead (firearms), a component of matchlock and flintlock guns
Doghead (novel), a novel by Danish author Morten Ramsland